Tia Clayton (born 17 August 2004) is a Jamaican sprinter. She ran the anchor legs of the 4 × 100 m relays that broke the world under-20 records at both the 2021 (42.94 s) and 2022 World U20 Championships (42.59 s).

Tia has twin sister, Tina Clayton, who ran the second leg of those world record relays.

References

External links
 

2004 births
Living people
People from Westmoreland Parish
Jamaican female sprinters
Twin sportspeople
Jamaican twins
World Athletics U20 Championships winners
21st-century Jamaican women